Estremadura Province may refer to:

Estremadura Province (historical), Portugal
Estremadura Province (1936-1976), Portugal

Province name disambiguation pages